The 1997 Tashkent Open was a men's tennis tournament held in Tashkent, Uzbekistan and played on outdoor hard courts. It was the inaugural edition of the tournament, part of the 1997 ATP Tour, and was held from September 8 to September 15.

Seeds
Champion seeds are indicated in bold text while text in italics indicates the round in which those seeds were eliminated.

Draw

Finals

References

External links
 Draw

Doubles
President's Cup
1997 in Uzbekistani sport